The western spotted thick-toed gecko (Pachydactylus serval) is a species of lizard in the family Gekkonidae. It is endemic to Namibia and South Africa.

References

Pachydactylus
Reptiles of Namibia
Reptiles of South Africa
Reptiles described in 1910